Champagne was a province in the northeast of the Kingdom of France, now best known as the Champagne wine region for the sparkling white wine that bears its name in modern-day France. The County of Champagne, descended from the early medieval kingdom of Austrasia, passed to the French crown in 1314.

Formerly ruled by the counts of Champagne, its western edge is about 160 km (100 miles) east of Paris. The cities of Troyes, Reims, and Épernay are the commercial centers of the area. In 1956, most of Champagne became part of the French administrative region of Champagne-Ardenne, which comprised four departments: Ardennes, Aube, Haute-Marne, and Marne. From 1 January 2016, Champagne-Ardenne merged with the adjoining regions of Alsace and Lorraine to form the new region of Grand Est.

Etymology
The name Champagne, formerly written Champaigne, comes from French meaning "open country" (suited to military maneuvers) and from Latin campanius meaning "level country" or "plain" which is also the derivation of the name of the Italian region of Campania. The toponym dates back to the Renaissance describing its vast chalk lined flat landscape.

History
In the High Middle Ages, the province was famous for the Champagne fairs, which were very important in the economy of the Western societies. The chivalric romance had its first beginnings in the county of Champagne with the famous writer Chrétien de Troyes who wrote stories of the Round Table from the Arthurian legends.

A few counts of Champagne were French kings with the comital title merging with the French crown in 1314 when Louis I, king of Navarre and count of Champagne, became king of France as Louis X. Counts of Champagne were highly considered by the French aristocracy.

References

External links

 
Geography of Aisne
Geography of Ardennes (department)
Geography of Aube
Geography of Côte-d'Or
Geography of Haute-Marne
Geography of Haute-Saône
Geography of Meuse (department)
Geography of Seine-et-Marne
Geography of Vosges (department)
Geography of Yonne
History of Hauts-de-France
History of Île-de-France
History of Grand Est
History of Bourgogne-Franche-Comté
History of Aisne
History of Ardennes (department)
History of Aube
History of Côte-d'Or
History of Haute-Marne
History of Haute-Saône
History of Meuse (department)
History of Seine-et-Marne
History of Vosges (department)
History of Yonne